M-132 was the designation of a former state trunkline highway in the Lower Peninsula of the US state of Michigan near Ann Arbor. The highway, commissioned in 1929, connected Ann Arbor and Dexter to the northwest along present-day Dexter–Ann Arbor Road. The roadway was turned back to local control around 1960.

Route description
Beginning at the intersection of Main Street and Baker Road in downtown Dexter, M-132 ran southeasterly along Main Street through town. Upon reaching the city limits, the highway became Dexter–Ann Arbor Road. It ran southeast across rural Washtenaw County through fields before entering Ann Arbor where it followed Dexter Avenue and terminated at US Highway 12 (US 12, Huron Street/Jackson Avenue).

History
M-132 was commissioned in October 1928 between Dexter and Ann Arbor; at the time it was created, it was fully paved. It remained in the same configuration until it was removed from the state trunkline system in December 1959, after the freeway carrying Interstate 94 and US 12 was completed near Ann Arbor. After removal from the state highway system, the roadway is now simply known as Dexter–Ann Arbor Road; it is two lanes wide throughout.

Major intersections

See also

References

External links

M-132 at Michigan Highways

132
M132